The 2021–22 ECAC Hockey men's ice hockey season is the 61st season of play for ECAC Hockey and will take place during the 2021–22 NCAA Division I men's ice hockey season. The regular season is set to begin on October 2, 2021 and conclude on February 26, 2022. The conference tournament is scheduled to begin in early March, 2022.

Season
While the conference was active during the 2020–21 season, eight of the twelve member teams had cancelled their campaigns as a result of the ongoing COVID-19 pandemic. The six Ivy League schools were joined by the two capital district programs in not playing but all schools committed to start the 2021–22 season on time.

Coaches
Reid Cashman was hired on June 1, 2020, however, due to the COVID-19 pandemic this is his first season behind the bench for Dartmouth.

Records

Standings

Non-Conference record
Of the sixteen teams that are selected to participate in the NCAA tournament, ten will be via at-large bids. Those 10 teams are determined based upon the PairWise rankings. The rankings take into account all games played but are heavily affected by intra-conference results. The result is that teams from leagues which perform better in non-conference are much more likely to receive at-large bids even if they possess inferior records overall.

ECAC Hockey had a very poor non-conference record. While the overall record wasn't awful, the league wasn't able to post a winning record against any other conference. Out of twelve members, just two finished with winning records while half of the member teams couldn't get above .250. While the conference, somewhat miraculously, posted a decent mark against NCHC, that wasn't nearly enough to salvage their collective rankings.

Regular season record

Statistics

Leading scorers
GP = Games played; G = Goals; A = Assists; Pts = Points; PIM = Penalty minutes

Leading goaltenders
Minimum 1/3 of team's minutes played in conference games.

GP = Games played; Min = Minutes played; W = Wins; L = Losses; T = Ties; GA = Goals against; SO = Shutouts; SV% = Save percentage; GAA = Goals against average

ECAC tournament

Note: * denotes overtime periods

NCAA tournament

Regional semifinal

Midwest

East

Regional final

Midwest

Ranking

USCHO

USA Today

Pairwise

Note: teams ranked in the top-10 automatically qualify for the NCAA tournament. Teams ranked 11-16 can qualify based upon conference tournament results.

Awards

NCAA

ECAC Hockey

ECAC Hockey tournament

2022 NHL Entry Draft

† incoming freshman

References

External links

2021-22
ECAC
2021–22